Muchnik Andrey Albertovich (February 24, 1958 – March 18, 2007) was a Soviet and Russian Mathematician and laureate of the A. N. Kolmogorov Prize (2006).

Biography 
Andrey Muchnik was born on February 24, 1958.

His parents were mathematicians, and they were students of P. S. Novikov.His Father was Albert Abramovich Muchnik, who solved Post's problem - about the existence of a non-trivial enumerable degree of Turing reducibility, and his mother was Nadezhda Mitrofanovna Ermolaeva.

He entered Moscow State University, where he began working as a mathematician at the seminar of Evgenii Landis and Yulij Ilyashenko for junior students of the Faculty of Mechanics and Mathematics of Lomonosov Moscow State University. His first work, on differential equations, was done in the second year under the guidance of Yu. S. Ilyashenko.

Starting from the third year, he specialized in the definability theory at the Department of Mathematical Logic, where Alexei Semenov was his supervisor. The topic of his diploma (1981) is the solution of the problem posed by Michael Rabin at the International Congress of Mathematicians in Nice to eliminate transfinite induction in the proof of Rabin's most important theorem on the solvability of the monadic theory of infinite tree. Later, An. A. Muchnik used his approach to prove. a generalization of Rabin's theorem announced by Shelah and Stupp. Using the original idea of Alfred Tarski he introduced in the notion of self-definability  to obtain a short and elegant proof [TCS] of Cobham - Semenov theorem [Siber} (see also [Bes] ).

An. A. Muchnik also contributed fundamental results in the field of algorithmic information theory (Kolmogorov complexity). Many results obtained by himself and in collaboration with colleagues were published after his death. An overview of his work is contained in the obituary.

He worked at the Institute of New Technologies and the Scientific Council of the USSR Academy of Sciences on the complex problem of "Cybernetics", was one of the actual leaders of the Kolmogorov seminar at Moscow State University.

Awards 
Andrey was awarded the A.N. Kolmogorov Prize Laureate (together with Alexei Semenov, 2006) - for outstanding achievements in the field of mathematics for the series of works «On the refinement of A.N. Kolmogorov, related to the theory of chance».

References

External links 
 Muchnik, Andrei Albertovich on the official website of the Russian Academy of Sciences
 Persons: Muchnik Andrey Albertovich. mathnet.ru. Retrieved 2016-3-15.
 

Russian mathematicians
Soviet mathematicians
Moscow State University alumni
Academic staff of Moscow State University
1958 births
2007 deaths